Paul Ralph Ehrlich (born May 29, 1932) is an American biologist best known for his pessimistic—and wildly inaccurate—predictions and warnings about the consequences of population growth and limited resources.

Ehrlich became well known for the controversial 1968 book The Population Bomb which he co-authored with his wife Anne H. Ehrlich, in which they famously—and erroneously—stated that "[i]n the 1970s hundreds of millions of people will starve to death in spite of any crash programs embarked upon now." Among the solutions suggested in that book was population control, including "various forms of coercion" such as eliminating "tax benefits for having additional children," to be used if voluntary methods were to fail, as well as letting "hopeless" countries like India starve to death. Highlighting Ehrlich's failed predictions, American journalist Jonathan V. Last has called The Population Bomb "one of the most spectacularly foolish books ever published".

Ehrlich has been criticized for his approach and views, both for their pessimistic outlook and for the repeated failure of his predictions to come true. For example, in response to Ehrlich's assertion that all major marine wildlife would die by 1980, Ronald Bailey termed Ehrlich an "irrepressible doomster". Ehrlich has acknowledged that "some" of what he predicted has not occurred, but nevertheless maintains that his predictions about disease and climate change were essentially correct and that human overpopulation is a major problem. 

He is the Bing Professor Emeritus of Population Studies of the Department of Biology of Stanford University and President of Stanford's Center for Conservation Biology.

Early life, education, and academic career

Ehrlich was born in Philadelphia, Pennsylvania, the son of William Ehrlich and Ruth Rosenberg. His father was a shirt salesman (unrelated to the German scientist Paul Ehrlich), his mother a Greek and Latin scholar and public school teacher. Ehrlich's mother's Reform-Jewish German ancestors arrived in the United States in the 1840s, and his paternal grandparents emigrated there later from the Galician and Transylvanian part of the Austrian Empire. During his childhood his family moved to Maplewood, New Jersey, where he attended Columbia High School, graduating in 1949.

Ehrlich earned a bachelor's degree in zoology from the University of Pennsylvania in 1953, an M.A. from the University of Kansas in 1955, and a Ph.D. from the University of Kansas in 1957, supervised by the prominent bee researcher Charles Duncan Michener (the title of his dissertation: "The Morphology, Phylogeny and Higher Classification of the Butterflies (Lepidoptera: Papilionoidea)"). During his studies he participated with surveys of insects in the areas of the Bering Sea and Canadian arctic, and then with a National Institutes of Health fellowship, investigated the genetics and behavior of parasitic mites. In 1959 he joined the faculty at Stanford University, being promoted to professor of biology in 1966. By training he is an entomologist specializing in Lepidoptera (butterflies). He was appointed to the Bing Professorship in 1977. He is well-known for popularizing the term coevolution in an influential 1964 paper co-authored with the botanist Peter H. Raven, where they proposed that an evolutionary 'arms-race' between plants and insects explains the extreme diversification of plants and insects. This paper was highly influential on the then-nascent field of chemical ecology.

He is president of the Center for Conservation Biology at Stanford University. He is a fellow of the American Association for the Advancement of Science, the United States National Academy of Sciences, the American Academy of Arts and Sciences and the American Philosophical Society.

Overpopulation debate

A lecture that Ehrlich gave on the topic of overpopulation at the Commonwealth Club of California was broadcast by radio in April 1967. The success of the lecture caused further publicity, and the suggestion from David Brower the executive director of the environmentalist Sierra Club, and Ian Ballantine of Ballantine Books to write a book concerning the topic. Ehrlich and his wife, Anne H. Ehrlich, collaborated on the book, The Population Bomb, but the publisher insisted that a single author be credited; only Paul's name appears as an author.

Although Ehrlich was not the first to warn about population issues — concern had been widespread during the 1950s and 1960s — his charismatic and media-savvy methods helped publicize the topic. The Tonight Show Starring Johnny Carson had Ehrlich on as a guest more than twenty times, with one interview lasting an hour.

Writings

The Population Bomb (1968)

The original edition of The Population Bomb began with the statement:  Ehrlich argued that the human population was too great, and that while the extent of disaster could be mitigated, humanity could not prevent severe famines, the spread of disease, social unrest, and other negative consequences of overpopulation.

His predictions were completely incorrect; no such famine occurred, and both population and global food supply continued to grow throughout the 1970s, the 1980s, and beyond. Despite this failed set of predictions, Ehrlich has continued to argue that societies must take strong action to decrease population growth in order to mitigate future disasters, both ecological and social.

In the book Ehrlich presented a number of scenarios detailing possible future events, some of which have been used as examples of errors in the years since. Of these scenarios, Ehrlich has said that although, "we clearly stated that they were not predictions and that 'we can be sure that none of them will come true as stated,' (p. 72) – their failure to occur is often cited as a failure of prediction. In honesty, the scenarios were way off, especially in their timing (we underestimated the resilience of the world system). But they did deal with future issues that people in 1968 should have been thinking about." Ehrlich further states that he still endorses the main thesis of the book, and that its message is as apt now as it was in 1968.

Ehrlich has proposed different solutions to the problem of overpopulation. In The Population Bomb he wrote, "We must have population control at home, hopefully through a system of incentives and penalties, but by compulsion if voluntary methods fail. We must use our political power to push other countries into programs which combine agricultural development and population control." Voluntary measures he has endorsed include the easiest possible availability of birth control and abortion. In 1967, he went so far as to insist that countries such as India be allowed to starve, while aid would only be given to those countries that were not considered to be "hopeless".

The book, while controversial at the time, became an object of ridicule decades later, as the failure of the predictions gradually became obvious. While Ehrlich himself refuses to publicly acknowledge that he was wrong, famines over the fifty years following the book's release were primarily due to war or other political instability, not a lack of food production or overpopulation.

As the Indian economist and Nobel Memorial Prize winner Amartya Sen argued, nations with democracy and a free press have virtually never suffered from extended famines. Indeed, since India became a democracy independent from British rule, it has yet to suffer from a famine, and its population has tripled, in spite of Ehrlich's warnings. Ehrlich's pointed criticism of India in particular (for instance, emphasizing the overpopulation of Delhi rather than Paris, which had nearly triple Delhi's population at the time of writing) has been criticized for focusing much more on "feelings" than on actual data.

Neither of the Ehrlichs have ever publicly accepted responsibility for their wildly inaccurate predictions, instead insisting that they were largely correct, despite the obvious errors in their predictions.

The Population Explosion (1990)
In their sequel to The Population Bomb, the Ehrlichs wrote about how the world's growing population dwarfs the Earth's capacity to sustain current living standards. The book calls for action to confront population growth and the ensuing crisis:

Optimum Human Population Size (1994)
In this paper, the Ehrlichs discuss their opinion on the 'optimal size' for human population, given current technological realities. They refer to establishing "social policies to influence fertility rates."

After 2000
During a 2004 interview, Ehrlich answered questions about the predictions he made in The Population Bomb. He acknowledged that "some" of what he had published had not occurred, but boasted that he felt "little embarrassment" and reaffirmed his basic opinion that overpopulation is a major problem. He noted that, "Fifty-eight academies of science said that same thing in 1994, as did the world scientists' warning to humanity in the same year. My view has become depressingly mainline!" Ehrlich also asserted that 600 million people were very hungry while billions were under-nourished, and insisted that his predictions about disease and climate change were essentially correct. Retrospectively, Ehrlich said that The Population Bomb, which predicted a widespread famine by 1985 that never materialized, was actually "way too optimistic".

In a 2008 discussion hosted by the website Salon, Paul Ehrlich has become more critical of the United States specifically, claiming that it should control its population and consumption as an example to the rest of the world. He still thinks that governments should discourage people from having more than two children, suggesting, for example, a higher tax rate for larger families.

In 2011, as the world's population passed the seven billion mark, Ehrlich argued that the next two billion people on Earth would cause more damage than the previous two billion, as humans now increasingly would have to resort to using more marginal and environmentally damaging resources. As of 2013, Ehrlich continued to perform policy research concerning population and resource issues, with an emphasis upon endangered species, cultural evolution, environmental ethics, and the preservation of genetic resources. Along with Dr. Gretchen Daily, he performed work in countryside biogeography; that is, the study of making human-disturbed areas hospitable to biodiversity. His research group at Stanford University examines extensively natural populations of the Bay checkerspot butterfly (Euphydryas editha bayensis).

The population-related disaster that Ehrlich predicted has completely failed to materialize, including the "hundreds of millions" of starvation deaths in the 1970s and the tens of millions of deaths in the United States in the 1970s and 1980s. Slowing of population growth rates and new food production technologies have increased the food supply faster than the population. Nonetheless, Ehrlich continues to stand by his general thesis that the human population is too large, posing a direct threat to human survival and the environment of the planet. Indeed, he states that if he were to write the book today, "My language would be even more apocalyptic." In 2018, he emphasized his view that the optimum population size is between 1.5 and 2 billion people. In 2022, he was a contributor to the "Scientists' warning on population," published by Science of the Total Environment, which estimated that a sustainable population would be between 2 and 4 billion people.

Reception

Critics have disputed Ehrlich's main thesis about overpopulation and its effects on the environment and human society, and his solutions, as well as some of his specific predictions made since the late 1960s. One criticism concerns Ehrlich's alarmist and sensational statements and inaccurate "predictions". Ronald Bailey of Reason magazine has termed him an "irrepressible doomster ... who, as far as I can tell, has never been right in any of his forecasts of imminent catastrophe." On the first Earth Day in 1970, he warned that "[i]n ten years all important animal life in the sea will be extinct. Large areas of coastline will have to be evacuated because of the stench of dead fish." In a 1971 speech, he predicted that: "By the year 2000 the United Kingdom will be simply a small group of impoverished islands, inhabited by some 70 million hungry people." "If I were a gambler," Professor Ehrlich concluded before boarding an airplane, " I would take even money that England will not exist in the year 2000." When this scenario did not occur, he responded that "When you predict the future, you get things wrong. How wrong is another question. I would have lost if I had had taken the bet. However, if you look closely at England, what can I tell you? They're having all kinds of problems, just like everybody else." Ehrlich wrote in The Population Bomb that, "India couldn't possibly feed two hundred million more people by 1980."

Carl Haub of the Population Reference Bureau has replied that it was precisely the alarmist rhetoric that prevented the catastrophes of which Ehrlich warned. According to Haub, "It makes no sense that Ehrlich is now criticized as being alarmist because his dire warnings did not, in the main, come true. But it was because of such warnings from Ehrlich and others that countries took action to avoid potential disaster." During the 1960s and 70s when Ehrlich made his most alarming warnings, there was a widespread belief among experts that population growth presented an extremely serious threat to the future of human civilization, although differences existed regarding the severity of the situation, and how to decrease it.

Canadian journalist Dan Gardner, in his 2010 book "Future Babble",  argues that Ehrlich has been insufficiently forthright in acknowledging errors he made, while being intellectually dishonest or evasive in taking credit for things he claims he got "right". For example, he rarely acknowledges the mistakes he made in predicting material shortages, massive death tolls from starvation (as many as one billion in the publication Age of Affluence) or regarding the disastrous effects on specific countries. Meanwhile, he is happy to claim credit for "predicting" the increase of AIDS or global warming. However, in the case of disease, Ehrlich had predicted the increase of a disease based on overcrowding, or the weakened immune systems of starving people, so it is "a stretch to see this as forecasting the emergence of AIDS in the 1980s." Similarly, global warming was one of the scenarios that Ehrlich described, so claiming credit for it, while disavowing responsibility for failed scenarios is a double standard. Gardner believes that Ehrlich is displaying classical signs of cognitive dissonance, and that his failure to acknowledge obvious errors of his own judgement render his current thinking suspect.

Barry Commoner has criticized Ehrlich's 1970 statement that "When you reach a point where you realize further efforts will be futile, you may as well look after yourself and your friends and enjoy what little time you have left. That point for me is 1972." Gardner has criticized Ehrlich for endorsing the strategies proposed by William and Paul Paddock in their book Famine 1975!. They had proposed a system of "triage" that would end food aid to "hopeless" countries such as India and Egypt. In Population Bomb, Ehrlich suggests that "there is no rational choice except to adopt some form of the Paddocks' strategy as far as food distribution is concerned." Had this strategy been implemented for countries such as India and Egypt, which were reliant on food aid at that time, they would almost certainly have suffered famines. Instead, both Egypt and India have greatly increased their food production and now feed much larger populations without reliance on food aid.

Left-wing critics
Another group of critics, generally of the political left, argues that Ehrlich emphasizes overpopulation too much as a problem in itself instead of distribution of resources. Barry Commoner argued that Ehrlich emphasized overpopulation too much as the source of environmental problems, and that his proposed solutions were politically unacceptable because of the coercion that they implied, and because they would cost poor people disproportionately. He argued that technological, and above all social development would result in a natural decrease of both population growth and environmental damage. Ehrlich denies any type of racism, and has argued that if his policy ideas were implemented properly they would not be repressive.

In a 2018 interview with The Guardian, Ehrlich, while still proud of The Population Bomb for starting a worldwide debate on the issues of population, acknowledged weaknesses of the book including not placing enough emphasis on overconsumption and inequality, and countering accusations of racism. He argues "too many rich people in the world is a major threat to the human future, and cultural and genetic diversity are great human resources." He advocated for an "unprecedented redistribution of wealth" in order to mitigate the problem of overconsumption of resources by the world's wealthy, but said "the rich who now run the global system — that hold the annual 'world destroyer' meetings in Davos — are unlikely to let it happen."

Simon–Ehrlich wager

The economist Julian Simon argued in 1980 that overpopulation is not a problem as such and that humanity will adapt to changing conditions. Simon argued that eventually human creativity will improve living standards, and that most resources were replaceable. Simon stated that over hundreds of years, the prices of virtually all commodities had decreased significantly and persistently. Ehrlich termed Simon the proponent of a "space-age cargo cult" of economists convinced that human creativity and ingenuity would create substitutes for scarce resources and reasserted the idea that population growth was outstripping the Earth's supplies of food, fresh water and minerals. This exchange resulted in the Simon–Ehrlich wager, a bet about the trend of prices for resources during a ten-year period that was made with Simon in 1980. Ehrlich was allowed to choose ten commodities that he predicted would become scarce and thus increase in price. Ehrlich chose mostly metals, and lost the bet, as their average price decreased by about 30% in the next 10 years. Simon and Ehrlich could not agree about the terms of a second bet.

Ehrlich's response to critics
Ehrlich has argued that humanity has simply deferred the disaster by the use of more intensive agricultural techniques, such as those introduced during the Green Revolution. Ehrlich claims that increasing populations and affluence are increasingly stressing the global environment, due to such factors as loss of biodiversity, overfishing, global warming, urbanization, chemical pollution and competition for raw materials. He maintains that due to growing global incomes, reducing consumption and human population is critical to protecting the environment and maintaining living standards, and that current rates of growth are still too great for a sustainable future.

Other activities
Ehrlich was one of the initiators of the group Zero Population Growth (renamed Population Connection) in 1968, along with Richard Bowers and Charles Lee Remington. In 1971, Ehrlich was elected to the Common Cause National Governing Board. He and his wife Anne were part of the board of advisers of the Federation for American Immigration Reform until 2003. He is currently a patron of Population Matters, (formerly known as the Optimum Population Trust).

Consistent with his concern about the impact of pollution and in response to a doctoral dissertation by his student Edward Goth III, Ehrlich wrote in 1977 that, "Fluorides have been shown to concentrate in food chains, and evidence suggesting a potential for significant ecological effects is accumulating."

Ehrlich has spoken at conferences in Israel on the issue of desertification. He has argued "true Zionists should have small families".

Personal life
Ehrlich has been married to Anne H. Ehrlich (née Howland) since December 1954; they have one daughter, Lisa Marie.

Ehrlich said that he has had a vasectomy.

Awards and honors
 The John Muir Award of the Sierra Club
 The Gold Medal Award of the World Wildlife Fund International
 A MacArthur Prize Fellowship
 The Crafoord Prize, awarded by the Royal Swedish Academy of Sciences and considered the highest award given in the field of ecology
 ECI Prize winner in terrestrial ecology, 1993
 A World Ecology Award from the International Center for Tropical Ecology, University of Missouri, 1993
 The Volvo Environmental Prize, 1993
 The United Nations Sasakawa Environment Prize, 1994
 The 1st Annual Heinz Award in the Environment (with Anne Ehrlich), 1995
 The Tyler Prize for Environmental Achievement, 1998
 The Dr. A. H. Heineken Prize for Environmental Sciences, 1998
 The Blue Planet Prize, 1999
 The Eminent Ecologist Award of the Ecological Society of America, 2001
 The Distinguished Scientist Award of the American Institute of Biological Sciences, 2001
 Ramon Margalef Prize in Ecology of the Generalitat of Catalonia, 2009
 Fellow of the Royal Society of London 2012
 2013 BBVA Foundation Frontiers of Knowledge Award in Ecology and Conservation Biology

Works

Books

 How to Know the Butterflies (1960)
 Process of Evolution (1963)
 Butterflies and Plants: A Study in Coevolution (1964)
 The Population Bomb (1968, revised 1971, updated 1978, re-issued 1988, 1998, 2008 and 2018)
 Population, Resources, Environments: Issues in Human Ecology (1970)
 How to Be a Survivor (1971)
 Man and the Ecosphere: Readings from Scientific American (1971)
 Population, Resources, Environments: Issues in Human Ecology Second Edition (1972)
 Human Ecology: Problems and Solutions (1973)
 Introductory Biology (1973)
 The End of Affluence (1975)
 Biology and Society (1976)
 Ecoscience: Population, Resources, Environment (1978)
 The Race Bomb (1978)
 Extinction (1981)
 The Golden Door: International Migration, Mexico, and the United States (1981)
 The Cold and the Dark: The World after Nuclear War (1984, with Carl Sagan, Donald Kennedy, and Walter Orr Roberts)
 The Machinery of Nature: The Living World Around Us and How it Works (1986)
 Earth (1987, co-authored with Anne Ehrlich)
 Science of Ecology (1987, with Joan Roughgarden)
 The Cassandra Conference: Resources and the Human Predicament (1988)
 The Birder's Handbook: A field Guide to the Natural History of North American Birds (1988, with David S. Dobkin and Darryl Wheye)
 New World, New Mind: Moving Towards Conscious Evolution (1988, co-authored with Robert E. Ornstein)
 The Population Explosion (1990, with Anne Ehrlich)
 Healing the Planet: Strategies for Resolving the Environmental Crisis (1991, co-authored with Anne Ehrlich)
 Birds in Jeopardy: The Imperiled and Extinct Birds of the United States and Canada, Including Hawaii and Puerto Rico (1992, with David S. Dobkin and Darryl Wheye)
 The Stork and the Plow : The Equity Answer to the Human Dilemma (1995, with Anne Ehrlich and Gretchen C. Daily)
 A World of Wounds: Ecologists and the Human Dilemma (1997)
 Betrayal of Science and Reason: How Anti-Environment Rhetoric Threatens Our Future (1998, with Anne Ehrlich)
  Wild Solutions: How Biodiversity is Money in the Bank (2001, with Andrew Beattie)
 Human Natures: Genes, Cultures, and the Human Prospect (2002)
 One With Nineveh: Politics, Consumption, and the Human Future (2004, with Anne Ehrlich)
 On the Wings of Checkerspots: A Model System for Population Biology (2004, edited volume, co-edited with Ilkka Hanski)
 The Dominant Animal: Human Evolution and the Environment (2008, with Anne Ehrlich)
 Humanity on a Tightrope: Thoughts on Empathy, Family, and Big Changes for a Viable Future (2010, with Robert E. Ornstein)
 Conservation Biology for All (2010, edited volume, co-edited with Navjot S. Sodhi)
 Hope on Earth: A Conversation (2014, co-authored with Michael Charles Tobias) 
 Killing the Koala and Poisoning the Prairie: Australia, America and the Environment (2015, co-authored with Corey J. A. Bradshaw)
 The Annihilation of Nature: Human Extinction of Birds and Mammals (2015, with Anne Ehrlich and Gerardo Ceballos)

Papers

See also
 Demography
 Population Connection (formerly Zero Population Growth), a non-profit founded by Ehrlich
 Malthusianism
 Netherlands fallacy
 Escape and radiate coevolution

Notes

References

Cited books

Further reading 
 Robertson, Thomas. (2012) The Malthusian Moment: Global Population Growth and the Birth of American Environmentalism, Rutgers University Press: New Brunswick, New Jersey. .

External links

 Paul R. Ehrlich's faculty web page at Stanford University
 Biographical page at the International Center for Tropical Ecology, University of Missouri, St. Louis
 
 "The Population Bomb Revisited", Electronic Journal of Sustainable Development, 2009
 Several online Paul Ehrlich interviews
 "Plowboy Interview" of Paul Ehrlich, 1974 from Mother Earth News
 Paul R. Ehrlich and the prophets of doom A look at Ehrlich's treatment of exponential growth.
 Paul Ehrlich, a prophet of global population doom who is gloomier than ever. The Guardian. October 2011.
 Paul R. Ehrlich Papers (finding aid to an archival collection at Stanford University's University Archives, most not available online)

1932 births
American ecologists
American environmentalists
American entomologists
American non-fiction environmental writers
Jewish American scientists
Fellows of the American Academy of Arts and Sciences
Fellows of the American Association for the Advancement of Science
Foreign Members of the Royal Society
Green thinkers
Living people
MacArthur Fellows
Members of the European Academy of Sciences and Arts
Members of the United States National Academy of Sciences
Stanford University Department of Biology faculty
Sustainability advocates
University of Kansas alumni
University of Pennsylvania alumni
20th-century American writers
21st-century American non-fiction writers
Winners of the Heineken Prize
Winners of the Ramon Margalef Prize in Ecology
Activists from California
Sierra Club awardees
Fellows of the Ecological Society of America
Columbia High School (New Jersey) alumni
People from Maplewood, New Jersey
Conservation biologists
21st-century American Jews